Foundations Forum was the first exclusively heavy metal music industry convention, held annually from 1988 to 1997 in Los Angeles.  The convention was set up by Concrete Marketing who had in January 1988 created the first industry trade magazine for the heavy metal world – Foundations. Realizing there was little or no attention or focus on this growing market, and having seen the far reaching distribution of the trade magazine, they decided to put together an annual meeting, bringing together key industry personnel, vendors and artists (and in later forums fans as well) offering advice on surviving the industry, discussing the changing climate of the scene and business, and allowing people to network.

Executive Director Bob Chiappardi summed up the purpose of the Forum: "The way heavy metal is growing, we want to be careful not to have it blow out.  By sitting down and talking about the genre, the good and the bad points, having the indies interacting with the majors, it makes for a healthy industry in general."

The forums usually invited a keynote speaker who would open the event and touch on important themes for the weekend ahead.  There would be panels and workshops made up of industry personnel particular to the theme who would discuss contemporary issues and answer questions.

There were also plenty of performances all weekend of the best signed and unsigned talent the heavy metal world had to offer, over the years including bands like Judas Priest, Pantera, Alice in Chains, Extreme, Ozzy Osbourne and Prong.

CD samplers of signed and unsigned artists were distributed to each forum attendee.

Foundations Forum '88 

On September 30 – October 1 at the Sheraton Universal Hotel in Los Angeles, Concrete Marketing, Metal Blade Records and RIP Magazine joined forces to create the first annual Foundations Forum convention.

The theme of FF88 was the credibility and respectability of metal within the music industry as a whole. 
Attendance, etc.

The Keynote speaker for the event was Sharon Osbourne and it incorporated parties in honor of RIP Magazine's second anniversary and Concrete's fourth.

Panels & Moderators

A two disc compilation cd was available free of charge to those attending the event, showcasing bands that Concrete was working with.

Disc 1:

Disc 2

Foundations Forum '89 

Foundations Forum 89 took place from September 21–23 at the Sheraton Universal Hotel in Los Angeles.  This was a week when three metal albums (by Skid Row, Mötley Crüe and Warrant) dominated Billboard's Top Pop Albums chart.

The focus of this convention was shifted more towards the development of new artists within the metal scene, emphasizing the growth and nurturing of the style.

The convention's attendance more than doubled this year to accommodate more than 2500 people, around a quarter of which were musicians.

The Keynote speaker for the event was KISS bassist Gene Simmons.

Panels & Moderators

The artist panel this year featured King Diamond, Robert Sweet (Stryper), Robin McAuley (MSG), Steve Jones, Lita Ford, Vicki Peterson (the Bangles), Scott Ian (Anthrax), Taime Downe (Faster Pussycat) and Anthony Kiedis (Red Hot Chili Peppers).

A double cassette named 'The Shape of Things to Come' featuring unsigned artists was given out this year along with the double disc compilation 'CD From Hell'.  In a special issue of Metal Hammer, interviews were run with all the unsigned bands featured on the compilation.

CD From Hell – Disc 1

CD From Hell – Disc 2

Foundations Forum '90 

Foundations Forum 90 took place at the Sheraton Plaza La Reina Hotel in Los Angeles from September 13–15, 1990.  This was the first year the event was open to the public and there were over 4,000 registrants.

The theme of this year's event was based loosely around metal's emerging social consciousness and responsibility (As Bob Chiappardi notes in his message from the directors):

Responsibility on the part of the industry to nurture new talent, the responsibility of the metal community to cultivate our increasing credibility within the industry, and the responsibility of us all to react to charges that our music is potentially or intrinsically dangerous with something other than mere hostility.

Tying in with this theme, a big topic of conversation at the forum was censorship and the keynote speaker for the event was Judas Priest frontman, Rob Halford.  At the time, Judas Priest had just been involved in a civil action whereby it was alleged they were responsible for the suicide of one youth from Nevada and the attempted suicide of his best friend via subliminal messages placed on one of the songs from their album, 'Stained Class'.

Although the case had eventually been thrown out of court, it was not the first of its kind and the metal world was having to defend itself against an ever-increasing number of censors.

Ozzy Osbourne, who had also been to court following the death of a teenager who listened to his music, joined his wife Sharon Osbourne and former California Governor Jerry Brown on one of the forum's panels to discuss the issue of censorship, which was a popular topic; a theme which spilled into several other panels over the weekend.

1990's forum was self-contained within the hotel and featured listening parties from Slayer, Motörhead, Scorpions, Iron Maiden and Deep Purple.  Not only was there major news/press coverage of the forum, but there were broadcasts directly from the convention by MTV, KNAC, Z-Rock and others, with some being syndicated all across the country.  Many will have come to cover the 18 signed bands which played at night including Judas Priest, Pantera, Exodus, Extreme, Alice In Chains and the London Quireboys.  Also, during the day, there were 18 unsigned bands performing including Radar, a New York band featuring lead singer Pamela Moore who sang the part of Sister Mary on Queensrÿche's Operation: Mindcrime album.

Two commercial video cassettes of FF90 highlights were  released through Strand/VCI, although these were  never to be released domestically.

Panels & Moderators

The Artist Panel included Jani Lane & Joey Allen (Warrant), KK Downing & Glen Tipton (Judas Priest), Vito Bratta (White Lion), Dave Mustaine (Megadeth) and Joe Leste (Bang Tango).

As well as a cassette featuring unsigned bands, a 3CD sampler was given out at this Foundations Forum.

Foundations Forum '90 CD Sampler – Disc 1

Foundations Forum '90 CD Sampler – Disc 2

Foundations Forum '90 CD Sampler – Disc 3

Foundations Forum '91 

Foundations Forum 91 took place at the Airport Marriott Hotel in Los Angeles from October 3–5, 1991.  This year the forum featured an industry only day as well as the first Foundations awards ceremony.  Paid attendance was up 15% on the previous year and exhibit room, directory sales, advertising, merchandising and record company participation were all up 25%.

Over half a million dollars was raised in aid of the TJ Martell Foundation, through ticket sales for the awards ceremony and at the casino night held as part of the convention.

Signed bands showcasing over the course of the three nights included Ozzy Osbourne, Soundgarden, Prong, Ugly Kid Joe, XYZ, Crimson Glory, The Almighty, Bang Tango, Claytown Troupe, Screaming Jets, Baby Animals, Lillian Axe and Asphalt Ballet.

A sponsor, Barq's Root Beer, also came on board for the first time at the convention.  Noting that their target market was those aged between 12 and 24, and recognizing the growing popularity of the metal genre amongst this age group, they partnered with Foundation's Forum in order to reach their audience directly.

Panels & Moderators

The artist panel this year included Mike Muir (Suicidal Tendencies), Ricky Warwick (The Almighty), Chris Cornell (Soundgarden), Jeff Ament (Pearl Jam), Phil Anselmo (Pantera), Dweezil Zappa, and Harry James and Luke Morley (Thunder).

Awards Ceremony

The first Foundations Awards ceremony was to recognize the significant contribution made by key artists to the heavy metal genre and the music industry as a whole.  The proceeds were donated to the TJ Martell Foundation and the ceremony featured performances by Blind Melon, Temple of the Dog, Alice in Chains and Megadeth.  The MC for the event was MTV's Riki Rachtman and awards presenters included Ronnie James Dio, Paul Stanley and Gene Simmons, Lemmy, Rick Rubin, Penelope Spheeris and Rikki Rokkett.

AWARDS

 Lifetime Achievement Award: Ozzy Osbourne
 Best Debut Album: Alice in Chains
 Best Hard Rock Band: Queensrÿche
 Top Artist (Radio Album): Megadeth – Rust In Peace
 Top Artist (Radio Cut): Megadeth – Hangar 18
 Top Artist (Retail): Queensrÿche – Empire
 Best Thrash Band: Megadeth
 Best Hard Alternative Band: Jane's Addiction
 Best Video (Single Cut): Slayer – Seasons in the Abyss/Janes Addiction – Been Caught Stealing
 Best Album Art: Jane's Addiction – Ritual de lo Habitual
 Top Independent Artist (Retail): Napalm Death – Harmony Corruption
 Top Home Video: Faith No More – Live at Brixton
 Top New Artist: Pantera

Foundations Forum 91 Sampler CD – Disc 1

Foundations Forum 91 Sampler CD – Disc 2

Foundations Forum 91 Sampler CD – Disc 2

This year a video cassette entitled 'A Weekend in Hell' was released through A&M Video.  The video featured performances from bands like Megadeth, Soundgarden, Ugly Kid Joe, Prong, Screaming Jets and XYZ.  Also featured were excerpts from panel discussions, awards acceptances and exhibits, serving as a taster for those who could not make it to the event itself.

Foundations Forum '92 

Foundations Forum 92 took place at the Stouffer Concourse Hotel in Los Angeles from October 1–3, 1992.  The theme of the convention on its fifth anniversary was the 'evolution of the genre' – exploring where they stood musically, and where they were likely headed.

Foundations Forum 92 was the venue for the World premiere screening of For Those About to Rock – Monsters in Moscow featuring AC/DC, Metallica, Pantera and Black Crowes.

Having established the ceremony the previous year, on Saturday night the Concrete Foundations Awards took place as part of the events at the hotel.

AWARDS

 Top Retail Album: 'Metallica' – Metallica  (based on Foundations Charts)
 Top Radio Cut: 'Mouth For War' – Pantera  (based on Foundations Charts)
 Top Radio Album: 'Metallica' – Metallica  (based on Foundations Charts)
 Top Home Video: 'Rusted Pieces' – Megadeth (based on Foundations Charts)
 Best Independent Artist: Sepultura (Editors Choice Award)
 Best Breakthrough Artist: Pearl Jam (Editors Choice Award)
 Best Hard Music Artist: Soundgarden (Editors Choice Award)
 The Hard Rockers' Hard Rocker Award: Aerosmith (Award chosen by their professional colleagues)

On the closing night of the convention, the TJ Martell Gambling Casino made another appearance in order to raise money for the charity, following success the previous year.

Panels & Moderators

Brian Slagel's (Metal Blade) Independent Labels Presidents Conclave was a significant meeting for those rock/metal labels  which, despite a fair amount of individual success, were under represented at other industry conventions or rarely had their voices heard.  This meeting covered significant topics like international distribution, domestic distribution, marketing, merchandising, touring and publicity, and gave the indies a chance to discuss the  problems and concerns they shared.

Foundations Forum '92 Sampler CD 1 

Foundations Forum '92 Sampler CD 2 

Foundations Forum '92 Sampler CD 3

Foundations Forum 93 

Foundations Forum 93 took place from September 9, 1993, to September 11, 1993, at the Burbank Hilton and Convention Center in LA.

Artists showcasing at this year's event included KISS, Scorpions, Schnitt Acht, Souls at Zero, My Sisters Machine, The Big F, Accept, Quicksand, La Salle, The Scream, I Mother Earth, Greta, Mind Bomb, Strip Mind, White Trash, Tad and Crowbar.

The artist panel this year featured Jerry Cantrell (Alice in Chains), Stevie Blaze (Lillian Axe), Jesse DuPree (Jackyl) and Rob Zombie (White Zombie).

Foundations Forum 93 CD Sampler Disc 1

Foundations Forum 93 CD Sampler Disc 2

Foundations Forum 93 CD Sampler Disc 3

Foundations Forum '94 

Foundations Forum '94 took place at the Burbank Hilton Hotel in LA from September 7–9, 1994.  The special address was given by Ted Nugent and Mercury Records provided a launch party at the Palace in Hollywood featuring performances by the Mighty Mighty Bosstones, Animal Bag, Shootyz Groove, Downset and Kerbdog.

Bands showcasing this year included Bile, Biohazard, Bruce Dickinson, Downset, Dream Theater, Drown, Fates Warning, Korn, Machine Head, Yngwie Malmsteen, Monster Voodoo Machine, My Head, Overkill, Wickerman, Wool, Dead Orchestra, Engines of Aggression, Juster, Wood, Paradise Lost, Planet Hate, Po' Boy Swing, Pushmonkey, Raven, Blackthorne and Vertical After.

Foundations Forum '94 CD Sampler – CD 1

Foundations Forum '94 CD Sampler – CD 2

Foundations Forum '94 CD Sampler – CD 3

Foundations Forum '94 CD Sampler – CD 4

Foundations Forum '95 

Foundations Forum '95 was hosted from Thursday September 7 – Saturday September 9, 1995  by the Burbank Hilton in Los Angeles, California.  It was to be the last forum of its kind, with plans for a new format taking shape for future meets.

Foundations Forum '95 Sampler CD – Disc 1

Foundations Forum '95 Sampler CD – Disc 2

Foundations Forum '95 Sampler CD – Disc 3

Foundations Forum '95 Sampler CD – Disc 4

F MusicFest '96 

As indicated the previous year, the event took on a different format for the meeting in 1996.  The organizers decided this year to return to their roots and rather than doing another convention under one roof, they chose instead to branch out.  Rather than feature 30 bands under one roof, they presented over 200 of them across 16 clubs from in and around the Hollywood and West Hollywood area.  The name also changed from Foundations Forum, to F Musicfest, and the line up changed to become more varied in terms of genre than in previous years.  Key elements remained from conventions past including the many panels and a focus issue – this year, drugs.

Concrete/Foundations presented the Outstanding Contribution to Music Award to Van Halen during the event.

Panels this year included:

Venues and Showcases

Moguls: 
Melvins, Knapsack, The Lemons, Jimmy Eat World, 3 Penny Needle, Three Mile Pilot.

Teaszer A: 
Coal Chamber, Downset, Abscess, Strife, Bloodlet, A.O.A., Nothingface, Ramp, I.4.N.I., The Back Alley Gators, the MF Pitbulls, Sexpod, NEar death Experience, The Violet Burning, Dead Birds, Padded Cell, Cynical, Tribe 8.

Smalls: 
Copperpot, Sunset Heights, Ms. 45, Punkinucle, Stone, Suncatcher, Chopper One, Frank Lloyd Vynl, Volebeats, Haynes Boys, Jackie On Acid, Tongue, The Black Watch, Ether.

The Viper Room: 
Revolux, 9 Iron, Likehell, Cellophane, Epperly, Choreboy, Brand New Unit, Coal, Placebo, Slightly Stoopid, Metal Molly, Les Claypool, Holy Mackerel, The Underbellys, The Ziggens.

The Martini Lounge: 
Super Junky Monkey, Crowbar, Hed, Drill, Dimestore Hoods, Killing Culture, Mind Heavy Mustard, Foreskin 500, Spahn Ranch, HeadCrash, The Notwist, Skold, 16Volt.

Hell's Gate: 
Hollow, Mindrot, Flambooky, December, Torment, Shoegazer, The Phoids, Stanley, Jud, Scraggly Jane, Cradle of Thorns, The Drugs, Wingnut Supreme.

Roxy: 
Sugartooth, Snot, Powerman 5000, Flood, Man Will Surrender, Salmon, Expanding Man, Agnes Gooch, Silverjet, Plexi, Ednaswap, triplefastaction, Beer Nuts, Humble Gods, Lidsville, Frontside.

Palace: 
Ugly Kid Joe, Motörhead, W.A.S.P., Supersuckers, House of Pain, Unwritten Law, 22 Jacks, Save Ferris, B-FAM, LA Guns, Warrant, Body Count, Stuck Mojo.

Troubadour: 
Maids of Gravity, Remy Zero, Haynes Boys, Perfect, Thermadore, Horny Toad!, Buck O Nine, Nerf Rider, Meal Ticket, The Grabbers, Mensclub, Johnny Bravo, Dakota Wildflowers, Sludge Nation.

Opium Den: 
Lo Preshur, Tories, Dashboard Prophets, Reejers, Fat Army, Lawsuit, Godplow, Don Knotts Overdrive, Battershell, FroSTed, Pennydreadful, haynuckle.

Whiskey: 
Kilgore Smudge, Man Is The Bastard, Brutal Juice, Neurosis, Red Dye No. 5, Wardog, Galactic Cowboys, Sacred Reich, Flotsam & Jetsam, Dogma, Molly Maguire, Far, Samiam, Crawlspace, Lit, Extra Fancy.

Jack's Sugar Shack: 
Smart Brown Handbag, Neverlast, Her Majesty The Baby, Inflatable Soul, Zoe, Kevin Hunter, Tribe of Gypsies, The Bill White Acre.

Luna Park 1: Radar Bros, Negro Problem, Black Moon Graffiti, Sparkler, Love Jones.

Billboard Live: Palomar, Five-Eight, Sweet Vine, Haynes Boys, Fountains of Wayne, Super 8, The Verve Pipe, Sufferbus.

Jack's: Customers, Blues Saraceno, Belltower, Bigelf.

F MusicFest '97 

Panels this year included:

Venues & Showcases

Hollywood Palladium:
Offspring, L7

Opium Den:
Other Star People, The Four Postmen, Farmer, DJ Sean Perry, Fluorescein, Amnesia, Sparkler, Tomorrowpeople, Wild Colonials, Dogstar, Mr Mirainga, Triple Fast action.
The Risk Records Showcase was also held here and featured the Autumns, Go! Dog! Go!, Jack Off Jill and Ozomatli.

Alligator Lounge:
Mineral, Crumb, Knapsack, Slush, Pink Noise Test, Number One Cup and Regatta 69

Whisky A Go-Go:
Nebula, Lit, Salmon, Slo Burn, Killingculture, Anthrax, Sevendust, Crushed.  Camel also presented a night here featuring Silverjet and aMiniature.

Billboard Live:
The Uninvited, Long Beach Dub Stars and Big Elf.

Coconut Teazer:
Swamp Boogie Queen, Mother Superior, Blake Morgan, Rat Bat Blue, Lucid, System of a Down, Flambookey, Manhole, Aunt Betty, Monet, Tree of Love, Lilyvolt, No.9.

Highland Grounds:
Elmore Lang, Clear, Nick St Nicholas, Michael Monarch.

The Palace:
Sly, Quiet Riot, Raven, Green Jelly, Strapping Young Lad, Exodus and Testament.

Jack's Sugar Shack:
Michelle Lewis, Jason Faulkner, Brent Fraser, Phil Cody, Tim Burlingame, Crown Jewels, Honky, The Piersons, The Hutchinson, Maria Fatal, The Love Revival, Coal and Marshall Coleman.

Martini Lounge:
Dubwar, Sparkmarker, Cast Iron Hike, Voodoo, Rubberneck, Near Death Experience, Hollow, Def Con Sound System, Skrew, Mess, the Drugs, Flood, Loungefly and Fat Amy.

Moguls:
Plastiscene, Gorgeous, Vitapup, Yortiose, Los Cincos, Plimpton and Clawhammer.

Roxy:
Events at the Roxy kicked off with the Geffen Records showcase featuring Extra Fancy, Human Waste Project and Total Chaos.  BAM Magazine also held a party here with performances from Sexpod, Powerman 5000, Incubus, Spank and Hed PE.  Other bands performing here as part of the festival included The Aquabats, Amen, Vitamin L, Dial 7 and Backside.

Viper Room:
The Cunninghams, Issa Joone, Daddy Longhead, Beer Nuts

The Garage:
Stillsuit, Will Haven, Ignite, Strife and Snapcase

Atlas:
Liquid Soul

References

External links 
Soundscan in the Los Angeles Times
Mike Shalett in the Los Angeles Times
Another article about Mike Shalett in the Los Angeles Times

Conventions (meetings)
Heavy metal subculture